"Hate Love" is the fourth and final single by the American pop group Girlicious' second album Rebuilt. It was produced by Josh Ramsay of Marianas Trench.  It was digitally released to iTunes on November 22, 2010 in Canada, as part of the album.

Radio
The song was sent to Canadian radio as a single on February 21, 2011.

Chart performance
The song debuted on the Canadian Airplay chart at number 44. The single eventually reached its peak on its tenth week on the chart, at number 19.
On the week of April 2, 2011, the song debuted on the Canadian Hot 100 at number 97. On the week of May 21, 2011, the song reached its peak at number 59. The single stayed on the Canadian Hot 100 chart for a total of 14 weeks.

Charts

Radio date

References

2011 singles
American dance-pop songs
Girlicious songs
Songs written by Josh Ramsay